George Thomas Murray (4 November 1859 – 25 July 1947) was a New Zealand civil engineer and surveyor. He was born in Dunedin, New Zealand on 4 November 1859.

References

1859 births
1947 deaths
New Zealand surveyors
Engineers from Dunedin
20th-century New Zealand engineers
19th-century New Zealand engineers